Gail Carriger is the pen name of Tofa Borregaard, an author of steampunk fiction and an American archaeologist. She was born in Bolinas, an unincorporated community in Marin County, California, and attended high school at Marin Academy. She received her undergraduate degree from Oberlin College, a masters of science in archaeological materials at England's University of Nottingham in 2000, and a master of arts in anthropology (with a focus on archaeology) at the University of California Santa Cruz in 2008. She is a 2010 recipient of the Alex Awards.

Novels
Carriger's first novel, Soulless, was published in 2009 by Orbit Books and earned her a nomination for the John W. Campbell Award for Best New Writer. The book was a Compton Crook Award nominee, a Locus Award finalist for Best First Novel, and Locus placed her on their recommended reading list. Her second novel, Changeless, was published in early 2010 and earned her a place on the New York Times Bestseller List. Her third novel, Blameless, was released in September 2010 and also became a New York Times bestseller. The five-book series continued with Heartless in late June 2011 and concluded with Timeless in March 2012.  Carriger was the guest of honor at FenCon, a science fiction convention in Dallas, Texas, in September 2011. Carriger lists "P. G. Wodehouse, Austen, Dickens, and Victorian travel journals" as influences on her writing.

Carriger's series for young adults, the four-book Finishing School series, launched with Etiquette & Espionage in February 2013 and was an instant New York Times bestseller. The Finishing School series takes place in the same world as the Parasol Protectorate series, featuring an earlier generation of characters. Book two in the Finishing School series, Curtsies & Conspiracies, was released in November 2013. In July 2012, final cover art and synopsis for Etiquette & Espionage were revealed along with the announcement of an additional series set in the Parasol Protectorate world, titled The Custard Protocol. The first novel in the Custard Protocol series was called Prudence, followed by Imprudence, Competence, and Reticence. The Supernatural Society and Delightfully Deadly novellas are also set in the Parasolverse.

Bibliography

Parasol Protectorate
 Soulless (2009) USA, Orbit Books , Pub date October 7, 2009, Paperback
 Changeless (2010) USA, Orbit Books , Pub date April 1, 2010, Paperback
 Blameless (2010) USA, Orbit Books , Pub date September 1, 2010, Paperback
 Heartless (2011) USA, Orbit Books , Pub date June 28, 2011, Paperback
 Timeless (2012) USA, Orbit Books, Pub date February 28, 2012, Paperback

Supernatural Society novellas
 Romancing the Inventor, Gail Carriger LLC, Pub date 1 November 2016, paperback / eBook.
 Romancing the Werewolf, Gail Carriger LLC, Pub date 5 November 2017, paperback / eBook.

Parasol Protectorate (manga)
 Soulless: The Manga, Vol. 1 (2012) USA, Yen Press , Pub date March 1, 2012, Paperback based on Soulless
 Soulless: The Manga, Vol. 2 (2012) USA, Yen Press , Pub date November 20, 2012, Paperback, based on Changeless
 Soulless: The Manga, Vol. 3 (2013) USA, Yen Press Pub date November 19, 2013, Paperback, based on Blameless

Finishing School
 Etiquette & Espionage (2013) USA, Little, Brown Books for Young Readers 
 Curtsies & Conspiracies (November 5, 2013) USA, Little, Brown Books for Young Readers 
 Waistcoats & Weaponry (November 4, 2014) 
 Manners & Mutiny (November 3, 2015)

Delightfully Deadly novellas
 Poison or Protect, Gail Carriger LLC, Pub date 21 June 2016, paperback / eBook
Defy or Defend, Gail Carriger, Pub date 3 May 2020, paperback/eBook
Ambush or Adore, Gail Carriger, Pub date 27 June 2022, paperback / eBook

The Custard Protocol
 Prudence (2015)
 Imprudence (2016)
 Competence (2018)
 Reticence (6 Aug 2019)

Claw and Courtship 

 How to Marry a Werewolf, Pub date 13 April 2020, paperback/eBook

San Andreas Shifters
 Marine Biology (2010) novella in The Mammoth Book of Paranormal Romance 2
 The Sumage Solution (2017)
 The Omega Objection (2018)
 The Enforcer Enigma (1 August 2020)
 The Dratsie Dilemma (forthcoming)

Short fiction
 My Sister's Song (2011)
 Marine Biology (2010) in The Mammoth Book of Paranormal Romance 2
 Fairy Debt (2013)
The Curious Case of the Werewolf that Wasn't, The Mummy that Was and the Cat in the Jar (2013)  The Book of the Dead

Other
 Which Is Mightier, the Pen or the Parasol? article (2010) Steampunk II: Steampunk Reloaded
The Heroine's Journey, non-fiction, Pub date 25 Aug 2020

Cultural references 
 Deathless is a 21-player Live action role-playing game run at Phenomenon Role-playing Convention during 2017 in Canberra, Australia, based on Gail Carriger's Parasol Protectorate series.
The Curious Case of the Corpsified Contact is a 5-player Live action role-playing game run at Phenomenon Role-playing Convention during 2019 in Canberra, Australia, based on Gail Carriger's Parasol Protectorate series.

References

Other sources

External links

 
 Finishing School book series (official)
 Podcast interview
 
 
 Tofa Borregaard at LC Authorities 

Living people
Oberlin College alumni
Alumni of the University of Nottingham
American paranormal romance writers
21st-century American novelists
American women novelists
American science fiction writers
Women science fiction and fantasy writers
People from Bolinas, California
Steampunk writers
University of California, Santa Cruz alumni
1976 births
Women romantic fiction writers
21st-century American women writers
Writers from California
Urban fantasy writers
American mystery writers
21st-century pseudonymous writers
Pseudonymous women writers